Verstegen is  a Dutch toponymic surname. Notable people with the surname include:

Lyda Verstegen, Dutch lawyer and activist
Mark Verstegen, American businessman
Mike Verstegen (born 1971), American football player
Willem Verstegen (1612–1659), Dutch explorer and merchant
Richard Verstegan (Rowlands) (c. 1550–1640), Anglo-Dutch antiquary
Ute Verstegen (born 1970), German archaeologist
Willem Verstegen (1612–1659), Dutch explorer and merchant; chief trader of the factory in Dejima
Spencer Verstegen (1995-), Digital marketer and traveler

See also
Versteeg

Dutch-language surnames
Toponymic surnames